Weldon Myrick (born Weldon Merle Myrick; April 10, 1938 – June 2, 2014) was an American steel guitar player.

Myrick was born in Jayton, Texas. His debut came in 1964, when he played on the #1 country hit "Once a Day" by Connie Smith. She would call Myrick "the guy who was responsible for creating the Connie Smith sound."

In the late 1960s, he joined Bobby Thompson and Charlie McCoy to form Area Code 615.

He was also a member of the group of session musicians in the Nashville, Tennessee-based group The Nashville A-Team. They backed many singers, including Eddy Arnold, Jim Reeves, Bob Dylan, Gary Stewart, Moon Mullican, and Jerry Lee Lewis.

He died in 2014, at the age of 76, after suffering a stroke.

Area Code 615 discography
Area Code 615, 1969
Trip in the Country, 1970

Discography as a session player

 Browns Sing the Big Ones from Country, The Browns, 1967 
 Make Mine Country, Charley Pride, 1968 
 Come from the Shadows, Joan Baez, 1972
 Home Free, Dan Fogelberg, 1972 
 Jesus Was a Capricorn, Kris Kristofferson, 1972
 Linda Ronstadt, Linda Ronstadt, 1972
 Dennis Linde, Dennis Linde, 1973
 Drift Away, Dobie Gray, 1973
 Tom Jans, Tom Jans, 1974
 Superpickers, Chet Atkins, 1974 
 Breakaway, Kris Kristofferson and Rita Coolidge , 1974
 Tattoo, David Allan Coe, 1977
 From a Radio Engine to the Photon Wing, Michael Nesmith, 1977
 Family Album, David Allan Coe, 1978
 Three on the Trail, Riders in the Sky, 1979 
 The Champ, Moe Bandy, 1980
 Feel the Fire, Reba McEntire, 1980
 The Baron, Johnny Cash, 1981 
 Heart to Heart, Reba McEntire, 1981
 One of a Kind, Moe Bandy, 1982 
 Unlimited, Reba McEntire, 1982
 Bobbie Sue,  The Oak Ridge Boys, 1982
 #8, J.J.Cale, 1983
 Somebody's Gonna Love You, Lee Greenwood, 1983
 Behind the Scene, Reba McEntire, 1983
 Just a Little Love, Reba McEntire, 1984
 Does Fort Worth Ever Cross Your Mind, George Strait, 1984 
 Have I Got a Deal for You, Reba McEntire, 1985
 Just a Woman, Loretta Lynn, 1985
 Paper Roses, Marie Osmond, 1973
 In My Little Corner of the World, Marie Osmond, 1974
 Who's Sorry Now, Marie Osmond, 1975
 Whoever's in New England, Reba McEntire, 1986
 Who Was That Stranger,  Loretta Lynn, 1988
 At This Moment, Neal McCoy, 1990
 Here in the Real World, Alan Jackson, 1990
 Greatest Hits, Vol. 3, Ronnie Milsap, 1991
 You've Got to Stand for Something, Aaron Tippin, 1991
 A Lot About Livin' (And a Little 'bout Love), Alan Jackson, 1992
 In This Life, Collin Raye, 1992
 Delta Dreamland, Deborah Allen, 1993 
 Honky Tonk Angels, Dolly Parton, Loretta Lynn, and Tammy Wynette, 1993
 If Only My Heart Had a Voice'', Kenny Rogers, 1993

Notes

1938 births
2014 deaths
American session musicians
Steel guitarists